On February 17, 2004 the Georgian Parliament approved with 165 votes to 5 Zurab Zhvania as Prime Minister and the new cabinet, which consists of 15 Ministers and four State Ministers. Most of the ministers in the new government are in their thirties and are western-educated. Four cabinet members are women.
One part of the ministers are the holdovers of the provisional authorities, which took over the power after the bloodless Rose revolution in November 2003. President Mikheil Saakashvili said also that the new cabinet would be “young, professional and the most progressive in the Eastern Europe.”

See also

Cabinet of Bidzina Ivanishvili
Cabinet of Georgia
President of Georgia
Parliament of Georgia

References
 

Government of Georgia (country)
2004 establishments in Georgia (country)